Robert L. Green (c. 1922 – July 1997) was the fashion director for Playboy Magazine from the 1950s through the 1970s. He was made Vanity Fair's best-dressed man of the year for 1972.
 He died in July 1997, aged 79.

References

External links 
 audio of 1970s era interview by Jerry Williams

1997 deaths
Playboy people
Year of birth uncertain
1920s births